Syzygium singaporense (synonym Pseudoeugenia singaporensis) is a species of plant in the family Myrtaceae. It is found in Peninsular Malaysia.

References

singaporense
Flora of Peninsular Malaysia
Taxonomy articles created by Polbot
Taxobox binomials not recognized by IUCN